Graham Kennedy (born 24 August 1999) is an Irish cricketer. He made his Twenty20 cricket debut for North West Warriors in the 2017 Inter-Provincial Trophy on 23 June 2017. He made his List A debut for North West Warriors in the 2018 Inter-Provincial Cup on 28 May 2018.

In December 2017, he was named in Ireland's squad for the 2018 Under-19 Cricket World Cup.

He made his first-class debut for North West Warriors in the 2018 Inter-Provincial Championship on 20 June 2018. In June 2019, he was named in the Ireland Wolves squad for their home series against the Scotland A cricket team.

In August 2021, Kennedy was named in Ireland's One Day International (ODI) squad for their series against Zimbabwe. The following month, Kennedy was named in Ireland's provisional squad for the 2021 ICC Men's T20 World Cup.

References

External links
 

1999 births
Living people
Irish cricketers
North West Warriors cricketers